A thienodiazepine is a heterocyclic compound containing a diazepine ring fused to a thiophene ring. 

If R1 and R2 are part of a triazole ring, the substance is called a "thienotriazolodiazepine."

The thienodiazepine structure forms the central core of some pharmaceutical and recreational drugs, including:

Bentazepam
Clotiazepam
Etizolam
Metizolam
Deschloroetizolam

Since thienodiazepines interact with the benzodiazepine receptor site, they typically have similar effects as benzodiazepines.

References

Thienodiazepines